Edinburgh BioQuarter is one of the UK’s leading health innovation locations. It boasts an established and growing ecosystem where leaders in healthcare, academia, economic development and local government work together to deliver a shared vision for its development.

It is a key initiative in the development of Scotland's life sciences industry, which  employs more than 39,000 people in over 750 organisations.

A community of 8,000 people currently work and study within the boundary of BioQuarter, located on the south side of Edinburgh, Scotland’s capital city. It is approximately three miles from the city centre and easily accessible by public transport, with Edinburgh International Airport a 20-minute journey by car, depending on traffic.

This 160-acre site is a melting pot of talent which includes award-winning health innovation businesses, the globally renowned  University of Edinburgh Medical School, 900-bed Royal Infirmary of Edinburgh, and new Royal Hospital for Children and Young People and Department of Clinical Neurosciences. The site is also home to NINE - Life Sciences Innovation Centre and many of the University of Edinburgh’s world-leading medical research institutes, including the Institute for Regeneration and Repair and Anne Rowling Regenerative Neurology Clinic.

Partnership and Economic Impact 
BioQuarter is a partnership with four of Scotland’s most prominent organisations - the City of Edinburgh Council, NHS Lothian, Scottish Enterprise and the University of Edinburgh - and together they work towards delivering a shared vision for the development of the location as a £1billion Health Innovation District.

Over the past three decades there has been over £600m investment in capital developments. BioQuarter has generated an estimated £2.72 billion in gross value added from its research, clinical and commercial activities, and a further £320 million from its development. On-going investments by the University of Edinburgh and NHS Lothian in academic and clinical facilities make it one of the most comprehensive health innovation locations in the UK.

History
In 1997, the Scottish Government obtained planning permission for land in the Little France area of Edinburgh for a new Royal Infirmary of Edinburgh and it was procured under a Private Finance Initiative contract in 1998. This allowed the Royal Infirmary of Edinburgh and the University of Edinburgh’s Medical School to relocate from their historic sites in Edinburgh city centre.

Development commenced immediately and in 2002 NHS Lothian opened the new Royal Infirmary of Edinburgh, a major acute teaching hospital. At the same time the University of Edinburgh completed its first phase of relocation of the College of Medicine and Veterinary Medicine with the move of medical teaching and research to the adjacent Chancellor’s Building.

In 2004 Scottish Enterprise, Scotland’s economic development agency, had acquired the surrounding land with a view to establishing one of Europe’s leading locations for life sciences companies. In 2007, following completion of a series of land deals which cleared a 55-acre site for development adjacent to the Royal Infirmary of Edinburgh, launched the creation of Edinburgh BioQuarter.

This was followed in 2006 by The Queens Medical Research Institute (QMRI), with the aim of addressing major disease challenges in Cardiovascular Science, Inflammation Research, Regenerative Medicine and Reproductive Health and the Centre for Regenerative Medicine, officially opened by the Princess Royal, dedicated to the study and development of new regenerative treatments for human diseases  and stem cell research to find new therapies for conditions including multiple sclerosis and heart and liver disease. The QMRI also houses part of the Edinburgh Imaging Facility.

In August 2010, British author J.K Rowling endowed research at BioQuarter with a £10 million gift to create the Anne Rowling Regenerative Neurology Clinic, in memory of her mother who died in 1990 from complications related to multiple sclerosis. The Clinic was officially opened in October 2013.

The first commercial facility on BioQuarter, NINE - Life Sciences Innovation Centre, was established in 2012 to house burgeoning spinouts and startup life sciences companies; this was joined in 2016 by commercial modular facilities in the form of BioCube 1 and BioCube 2.

Health Innovation District and Planned Developments 
By 2035, BioQuarter will be a vibrant Health Innovation District - a new mixed use, urban neighbourhood of Edinburgh, supporting a community of more than 20,000 people and centred on world-leading health innovators and businesses.

The £1billion (GDV) development will unlock its full potential, accelerate its growth and deliver a global destination for pioneering health innovation focused on life sciences R&D, data-driven innovation (digital health and med tech), medical teaching, healthcare delivery and commercial enterprise.

With plans to expand the city’s tram network to BioQuarter by 2030, the development of the Health Innovation District will support an estimated 9,000 new jobs and deliver a net zero location that promotes the wellbeing of its community and its neighbours.

The pipeline of academic and clinical developments include the University of Edinburgh Institute for Regeneration and Repair (due to open in 2022), Usher Institute (due to open in 2024), co-location of Biomedical and Medical Teaching and NHS Lothian’s Princess Alexandra Eye Pavilion.

Community Collaboration in response to COVID-19 
The expertise and collaborative nature of BioQuarter’s community was demonstrated in extensive efforts during the COVID-19 crisis.

The Queen's Medical Research Institute (QMRI ) COVID-related Research Hub  was established as a rapid response to the COVID-19 pandemic, bringing together experimental medicine clinical studies, interdisciplinary research teams, industrial partners and academic collaborators to understand the mechanisms of disease and discover effective treatments, whilst repurposing facilities and expertise to continue essential world-class biomedical pre-clinical research.

Up to 150 researchers  from the Centre for Inflammation Research were re-deployed to work on a new project – STOPCOVID – focusing on the inflammatory pathways that lead directly to lung injury, associated with the most severe aspects of COVID-19 and to test existing and experimental drugs to find a treatment.

In 2022, a new multi-million pound research programme to develop treatments for lung infections such as COVID-19 and future pandemics was announced.

Companies at BioQuarter
Companies  based on Edinburgh BioQuarter include:
 RoslinCT - GMP contract manufacturing and development organisation (CMDO), originally founded as Roslin Cells in 2006.
 Fios Genomics – genomic and bioinformatics data analysis services for drug discovery & development.
 Concept Life Sciences - pre-clinical Contract Research Organisation (CRO) and acquired by Concept Life Sciences, a Malvern Panalytical brand, in 2020.
 Calcivis - dentistry imaging system 
 Edinburgh Molecular Imaging - clinical phase biotechnology company 
 Galecto, Inc. – biotech developing small molecules for the treatment of severe diseases, including fibrosis, cancer, and inflammation 
 Pharmatics - AI powered digital health converting medical knowledge into predictive software 
 LifeArc - UK registered and self-funding charity, collaborating with scientists on diagnostics and therapies.
 Resolution Therapeutics - developing macrophage cell therapies to treat diseases characterised by life-threatening inflammatory organ damage

See also
Midlothian BioCampus, a nearby life sciences enterprise area
Inverness Campus, Highland
Midlothian Science Zone, a centre of science and research excellence on the southern edge of Edinburgh

References

External links
Edinburgh BioQuarter homepage

 

Biology education
Biology organisations based in the United Kingdom
Biotechnology in the United Kingdom
2007 establishments in Scotland
2007 in science
Economy of Edinburgh
Education in Scotland
Enterprise areas of Scotland
Science and technology in Edinburgh
Science parks in the United Kingdom